Croze is a commune in the Creuse department in the Nouvelle-Aquitaine region in central France.

Geography

Population

Notable sites
 A twelfth-century church of St. John at Montel-Guillaume.
 The fifteenth-century chapel of St. Antoine.
 The nineteenth-century château de Mas-Laurent, which replaced an earlier building.

Personalities
Lucien Le Cam, mathematician, was born here.

See also
Communes of the Creuse department

References

Communes of Creuse